Loser is the name of a mountain in the Ausseerland in Austria which has an elevation of 1,838 metres above sea level.

The mountain is the most prominent landmark of the Ausseerland. Among the locals, it is also known as the Ausseer Ohrwaschl (Aussee Ear) because of its shape. It is possible to almost reach the peak by car by using a toll road of 9 km. There is an extensive parking lot in front of the Loser Restaurant at an elevation of 1600 m, from where one can embark on various tours. The  (1643 m / 250 m × 100 m) is located close to the restaurant and is an attractive target for hiking which can be reached with just a little walking. From there onwards, one can reach the peak by passing the Loser-Fenster (Loser Window), a natural rock gate. One of the most important ski resorts of the Ausseerland is located on the Loser and spans about 1000 meters of elevation. During the descent, one passes a second gastronomic establishment, the Loserhütte at 1498 m.

Loser Solar Plant
The largest solar power plant of the Alps is located on the southern slope of Loser at an elevation of 1600 metres. The pure air, the usual absence of fog, and, in winter, reflection of sunlight from snow, create good conditions for obtaining electricity from sunlight in the mountains. The Loser plant was built from 1988 to 1989 and consists of 598 solar modules covering a total surface area of 263 m². Its original architect Abdur-Rahman Rana, designed the module's inclination of 60 degrees allows for a stable delivery of electricity throughout the year. Three generators (from the USA, Japan and Germany) produce about 30 kilowatts under optimal conditions, which enter the electrical network through a power inverter.

Gallery

External links
  Official site
  Solar plant - Loser (Energie AG)
  Touren

Mountains of Styria
Totes Gebirge
Mountains of the Alps